Donatia novae-zelandiae is a species of cushion plant in the family Donatiaceae and is closely related to species in the family Stylidiaceae. It is found in the alpine and subalpine regions of New Zealand and Tasmania. Donatia novae-zelandiae has free stamens and petals, paracytic stomata, and a pollen morphology distinct from the genera of the sister family Stylidiaceae. It was first described by Joseph Dalton Hooker in 1853 and published in his Flora Novae-Zelandiae.

References

Asterales of Australia
Cushion plants
Stylidiaceae
Flora of New Zealand
Flora of Tasmania
Plants described in 1853
Taxa named by Joseph Dalton Hooker